Douglas Martin Young (15 April 1924 – 18 June 1993) was an English first-class cricketer who played for Gloucestershire and Worcestershire. He was a right-handed opening batsman.

Young played for Worcestershire from 1946 to 1948, then for Gloucestershire from 1949 to 1964. He scored 23,400 runs in his career with Gloucestershire, including 40 hundreds. His most prolific year came in 1959 when he managed 2090 runs. It was the second time that he had passed 2000 runs in a season, having also done so in 1955. In 1962 he put on 395 with Ronald Nicholls against Oxford University which remains the highest first-class opening stand by Gloucestershire; Young made his highest first-class score of 198.

After his playing career ended he emigrated to South Africa, where he appeared regularly on radio as a cricket commentator.

References

External links
 Cricket Archive
 Gloucestershire batting records
 Martin Young at Cricinfo

1924 births
1993 deaths
English cricketers
Worcestershire cricketers
Gloucestershire cricketers
Commonwealth XI cricketers
English cricket commentators
Marylebone Cricket Club cricketers
A. E. R. Gilligan's XI cricketers